The 2022 Jennerstown Salutes 150 was a NASCAR Whelen Modified Tour race that was held on May 28, 2022. It was contested over 150 laps on the  oval. It was the 5th race of the 2022 NASCAR Whelen Modified Tour season. Tommy Baldwin Racing driver Mike Christopher Jr. collected his first career Modified Tour victory in only his 3rd career start.

Report

Entry list 

 (R) denotes rookie driver.
 (i) denotes driver who is ineligible for series driver points.

Practice

Qualifying

Qualifying results

Race 

Laps: 150

References 

2022 NASCAR Whelen Modified Tour
2022 in sports in Pennsylvania
Jennerstown Salutes 150